Star Wars Uncut is a 2010 online parody film produced, edited and directed by Casey Pugh. It is a shot-for-shot recreation of the 1977 film Star Wars consisting of 473 fifteen-second segments created and submitted from a variety of participants. The full film was made available on YouTube in August 2010 for free distribution. Several clips from the film were used in the 2010 documentary The People vs. George Lucas.

Production
In July 2009, Pugh created a website where fans could sign up to recreate specific 15-second scenes from the Star Wars film. Multiple submissions were submitted for each scene, and votes were held to determine which ones would be added to the final film. Although the scenes reflect the dialogue and imagery of the original film, each scene is created in a separate distinct style, such as live-action, animation and stop-motion.

Many of the sequences are filmed in deliberately crude, low-budget or otherwise comical manners, and the actors do not always resemble the original cast. One scene is a stop-motion sequence using Lego Star Wars figurines. Another mimics the animation style of the 1968 Beatles film Yellow Submarine. Others are parodies of specific pop culture subgenres, such as anime and grindhouse films. Star Wars Pez candy dispensers are featured prominently in some scenes.

Annelise Pruitt was the designer of the Star Wars Uncut website. Jamie Wilkinson worked as developer and Chad Pugh as designer.

Star Wars Uncut won a Creative Arts Emmy Award for Outstanding Achievement in Interactive Media on August 21, 2010. The producers were encouraged to submit it to the awards by Richard Cardran, a past Emmy winner and member of the National Academy of Television Arts and Sciences. Pruitt, Wilkinson, Casey Pugh and Chad Pugh each received an Emmy award. They also received a 2021 Co-Creation Peabody Award.

On October 10, 2014, the sequel, Empire Uncut, was released on the official Star Wars YouTube channel.

References

External links

 Official site
 Interview with Casey Pugh, Creator of Star Wars Uncut

2010 films
2010 independent films
American parody films
American independent films
Remakes of American films
Fan films based on Star Wars
Crowdsourcing
Shot-for-shot remakes
2010s English-language films
2010s American films